Dušan Jovanović Đukin also spelled Dušan Jovanović Đukin (Serbian Cyrillic: Душан Јовановић Ђукин; Belgrade, Kingdom of Serbia, 16 June 1891 - Belgrade, Serbia, Kingdom of Yugoslavia, 27 October 1945) was a Serbian academic sculptor trained in Paris. Cubism was his speciality.

Dušan Jovanović Đukin is one of two representatives of the cubist sculpture of his generation, the other was Živojin Lukić.

Đukin grew up in his father's photography studio in Belgrade (his father is Milan Jovanović, and artists Paja Jovanović and Svetislav Jovanović are Milan's brothers). Since 1904, it was the first purpose-built photography studio in Serbia. As a child, Dušan went through the horrors of war, and when he came to Paris to study sculpture and painting, he decided on sculpture early because his two uncles lived in Paris and were already well-established artists.

Biography
Dušan Jovanović Đukin was born and raised in a wealthy patrician family. His father was a court photographer, uncle Paja Jovanović, and he took a pseudonym from his grandfather Stevan Jovanović, a photographer from Vršac when they called him Đuka.

He studied architecture in Dresden, sculpture in Florence, and then studied at the École des Beaux-Arts in Paris. From 1917 to 1927, he stayed in Paris, where he participated in the Exhibition of Yugoslav Artists in 1919. In Belgrade, at the Kolarac People's University, he started an evening art course in 1927, together with the painter Mladen Josić. After a year, he went to Paris again and returned to Belgrade after four years. He started working as a teacher at the Academy of Applied Arts.

After a long and severe illness, he died in Belgrade in 1945.

He exhibited at several group exhibitions in the country and abroad (Belgrade, Florence and Paris), but during his lifetime he did not have a single solo exhibition. He was a member of the art group "Lada". He left behind only about thirty sculptures, a small number of drawings, ceramics and medallions. It is known that, when he was not satisfied with the outcome, he destroyed his works. He was also engaged in painting, but none of that has survived.

Works
His work can be found in the National Museum in Belgrade along with his contemporaries Živojin Lukić, Risto Stijović, Radeta Stanković (1905-1996), Petar Palaviccini, Đorđe Oraovac (1891-1955), Mihailo Tomić (1902-1995), Milan Nedeljković (1896-1947), Vladeta Piperski (1908-1942), Milan Besarabić (1908-2011), and Stevan Bodnarov (1905-1993).

 Girl with flowers:
He adopted the ideas of the Paris School but did not directly adopt the views of Cubism. Retains classic volume and taut mass. He boldly cuts it and introduces innovative geometrizations.

 The Girl with the mandolin
He is even bolder in cutting. It does not go as far as Archipenko in cubist forms. It holds a compact mass and anthropomorphism like a traditional classical sculpture, although it cuts the legs and lowers them. It also sticks to the face and does not count on the side view, while with the Cubist this observation from multiple angles is very important.

 Girl's head:
Here Đukin shows all the qualities of understanding cubism that is not radically innovative. But you can see the feeling current after the First World War, and that is the so-called "back to order". You can see the partially aggressive treatment of the form (it deepens and bulges the cheek), but it introduces graphic styling, a linear element of hair that can be connected with the experience of Art Deco.

It also has a smile like a Cretan woman, a classical sculpture style, which reminds us that many artists return to the classics after the war. The nose is like an African sculpture. It makes a wonderful turn in the neck, the head does not stand completely vertically. She was decentred as if she had slipped out of the door. This is a very nice step forward in the search for new relationships and balance in sculpture, which is also very imaginative for Serbian creativity.

References 

 Translated and adapted from a Serbianbiography: Dušan Jovanović Đukin (1891—1945) 

1891 births
1945 deaths
20th-century Serbian sculptors
Artists from Belgrade
École des Beaux-Arts
Cubist sculptures
Yugoslav expatriates in France